The Sooretama slaty antshrike (Thamnophilus ambiguus) is a species of bird in the family Thamnophilidae. It is endemic to coastal regions of eastern Brazil between Sergipe and São Paulo. It was previously included in the widespread slaty antshrike (T. punctatus), but following the split, this scientific name is now restricted to the northern slaty antshrike.

It occurs at low levels in forest and woodland, especially, but not exclusively, humid.

The Sooretama slaty antshrike was described by the English naturalist William Swainson in 1825 and given its current binomial name Thamnophilus ambiguus.

References

Sooretama slaty antshrike
Birds of the Atlantic Forest
Endemic birds of Brazil
Sooretama slaty antshrike
Taxonomy articles created by Polbot